The England Hockey Women's Championship Cup is a field hockey cup competition organised by England Hockey that features women's teams from England. The competition was originally known as the Women's National Clubs Championship. The inaugural competition was won by the Chelsea College of Physical Education (Eastbourne) in 1977–78. It has also been known as the All England Women's Hockey Association Cup, the EHA Cup and the EH Women's Cup. During the 2010s it was sponsored by Investec and was known as the Investec Women's Cup.

Finals

Women's National Clubs Championship

Notes

AEWHA Cup

Notes

EHA Cup

Notes

EH Women's Cup

Investec Women's Cup

EH Women's Championship Cup

Notes

See also
Women's England Hockey League
England Hockey Men's Championship Cup
Men's England Hockey League

References

Women's field hockey competitions in England
England
Field hockey cup competitions in England
1977 establishments in England